Zhongguo renming dacidian (《中国人名大辞典》 first published 1921), literally Great Biographical Dictionary of China is the leading biographical dictionary in China, to some extent comparable with Who's Who. The publisher for 70 years is Commercial Press, Shanghai. In English bibliographies it is sometimes referred to by English titles, even though an English version does not exist; sometimes by its Chinese title in pinyin.

The original 1921 editors were Fang Baoguan (方宝观), Fang Yi (方毅) and a team of 23 editors. Although the Chinese title is only used by Commercial Press, longer titles including the Commercial Press title have occasionally appeared from other publishers for more specialist works. For example, Zhongguo renming dacidian: xianren dang-zhengjun lingdao renwujuan (Who's Who in China - Current leaders in the Party Government and Military) is published by Beijing Foreign Languages Publishing House.

References

Biographical dictionaries
Chinese dictionaries